Ekkalarp Hanpanichkij (born  May 8, 1994) is a Thai professional footballer who plays as an defensive midfielder.

References

External links
https://int.soccerway.com/players/ekkalarp-hanpanichkij/476403/
https://www.livesoccer888.com/thaipremierleague/2018/teams/Suphanburi-FC/Players/Ekkalab-Hanpanitchakul

1994 births
Living people
Ekkalarp Hanpanichkij
Association football midfielders
Ekkalarp Hanpanichkij
Ekkalarp Hanpanichkij
Ekkalarp Hanpanichkij
Ekkalarp Hanpanichkij
Ekkalarp Hanpanichkij
Ekkalarp Hanpanichkij